Mirandisca harpalyce is a moth of the subfamily Arctiinae. It is found in Brazil.

References

Cosmosoma
Moths described in 1892